Comitas stolida is a species of sea snail, a marine gastropod mollusc in the family Pseudomelatomidae, the turrids and allies.

Distribution
This marine species occurs off South Africa.

References

  Barnard K.H. (1958), Contribution to the knowledge of South African marine Mollusca. Part 1. Gastropoda; Prosobranchiata: Toxoglossa; Annals of The South African Museum v. 44 pp. 73–163

External links
 Biolib.cz: Comitas stolida
 
 

Endemic fauna of South Africa
stolida
Gastropods described in 1843